The coho salmon (Oncorhynchus kisutch; Karuk: achvuun)  is a species of anadromous fish in the salmon family and one of the five Pacific salmon species. Coho salmon are also known as silver salmon or "silvers". The scientific species name is based on the Russian common name kizhuch (кижуч).

Description

During their ocean phase, coho salmon have silver sides and dark-blue backs. During their spawning phase, their jaws and teeth become hooked. After entering fresh water, they develop bright-red sides, bluish-green heads and backs, dark bellies and dark spots on their backs. Sexually maturing fish develop a light-pink or rose shading along the belly, and the males may show a slight arching of the back. They also develop a large kype (hooked beak) during spawning. Mature females may be darker than males, with both showing a pronounced hook on the nose.

Reproduction

The eggs hatch in the late winter or early spring after six to seven weeks in the redd. Once hatched, they remain mostly immobile in the redd during the alevin life stage, which lasts for 6–7 weeks. Alevin no longer have the protective egg shell, or chorion, and rely on their yolk sacs for nourishment during growth. The alevin life stage is very sensitive to aquatic and sedimental contaminants. When the yolk sac is completely resorbed, the alevin leaves the redd. Young coho spend one to two years in their freshwater natal streams, often spending the first winter in off-channel sloughs, before transforming to the smolt stage. Smolts are generally  and as their parr marks fade and the adult's characteristic silver scales start to dominate. Smolts migrate to the ocean from late March through July. Some fish leave fresh water in the spring, spend summer in brackish estuarine ponds, and then return to fresh water in the fall. Coho salmon live in salt water for one to three years before returning to spawn. Some precocious males, known as "jacks", return as two-year-old spawners. Spawning males develop kypes, which are strongly hooked snouts and large teeth.

Range
The traditional range of the coho salmon runs along both sides of the North Pacific Ocean, from Hokkaidō, Japan and eastern Russia, around the Bering Sea to mainland Alaska, and south to Monterey Bay, California.  Coho salmon have also been introduced in all the Great Lakes, as well as many landlocked reservoirs throughout the United States. A number of specimens, (more than 20), were caught in waters surrounding Denmark and Norway in 2017. Their source is currently unknown, but the salmon species is farmed at several locations in Europe, making it probable that the animal has slipped the net at such a farm.

Human uses

Fisheries
The total North Pacific harvest of coho salmon in 2010 exceeded 6.3 million fish, of which 4.5 million were taken in the United States and 1.7 million in Russia. This corresponds to some 21,000 tonnes in all. Coho salmon are the backbone of the Alaskan troll fishery; however, the majority are caught by the net fishery (gillnet and seine). Coho salmon average 3.5% by fish and 5.9% by weight of the annual Alaska salmon harvest. The total North Pacific yields of the pink salmon, chum salmon and sockeye salmon are some 10–20 fold larger by weight.

Game fish
In North America, coho salmon is a game fish in fresh and salt water from July to December, especially with light fishing tackle. It is one of the most popular sport fish in the Pacific Northwest of the United States and Canada. Its popularity is due in part to the reckless abandon which it frequently displays chasing bait and lure while in salt water, and the large number of coastal streams it ascends during its spawning runs. Its habit of schooling in relatively shallow water, and often near beaches, makes it accessible to anglers on the banks, as well as in boats.

It is also pursued by fly fisherman in salt water.

Nutritional value
Ocean-caught coho is regarded as excellent table fare. It has a moderate to high amount of fat, which is considered to be essential when judging taste. Only spring chinook and sockeye salmon have higher levels of fat in their meat. When smoking coho it is best to use a cold-smoking rather than hot-smoking process, due to their lower fat content compared to sockeye and chinook.

Cultural tradition
Historically coho, along with other species, has been a staple in the diet of several indigenous peoples, who would also use it to trade with other tribes farther inland. The coho salmon is also a symbol of several tribes, representing life and sustenance.

Ecology
In their freshwater stages, coho feed on plankton and aquatic invertebrates in the benthos and water column, such as Chironomids, midge larvae, and terrestrial insects that fall into the water. Upon entering the marine environment, they switch to a diet of plankton and fish, with fish making up most of their diets after a certain size. Adult coho feed on a vast variety of prey items that depend on the region they reside in during their second year at sea. Spawning habitats are small streams with stable gravel substrates.

Salmonid species on the west coast of the United States have experienced dramatic declines in abundance during the past several decades as a result of human-induced and natural factors.

Conservation

The U.S. National Marine Fisheries Service (NMFS) has identified seven populations, called Evolutionary Significant Units (ESUs), of coho salmon in Washington, Oregon and California. Four of these ESUs are listed under the U.S. Endangered Species Act (ESA). These are the Lower Columbia River (threatened), Oregon Coast (threatened), Southern Oregon and Northern California Coasts (threatened), and Central California Coast (endangered). The long-term trend for the listed populations is still downward, though there was one recent good year with an increasing trend in 2001.

The Puget Sound/Strait of Georgia ESU in Washington is an NMFS "Species of Concern". Species of Concern are those species for which insufficient information prevents resolving the U.S. National Oceanic and Atmospheric Administration's concerns regarding status and threats and whether to list the species under the ESA.

On May 6, 1997, NMFS, on behalf of the Secretary of Commerce, listed as threatened the Southern Oregon/Northern California Coast coho salmon ESU. The coho salmon population in the Southern Oregon/Northern California region has declined from an estimated 150,000–400,000 naturally spawning fish in the 1940s to fewer than 10,000 naturally producing adults today. These reductions are due to natural and man-made changes, including short-term atmospheric trends (such as El Niño, which causes extremes in annual rainfall on the northern California coast), predation by the California sea lion and Pacific harbor seal, and commercial timber harvesting.

More than 680,000 coho salmon returned to Oregon in 2009, double that of 2007. The Oregon Department of Fish and Wildlife required volunteers to herd fish into hatchery pens. Some creeks were reported to have  so many fish, "you could literally walk across on the backs of coho," claimed a Portland television station. Lower temperatures in 2008 North Pacific waters brought in fatter plankton, which, along with greater outflows of Columbia River water, fed the resurgent populations. The 2009 run was so large, food banks were able to freeze  for later use.

See also
 Pre-spawn mortality in coho salmon

Footnotes

References

Technical reports
Use of three microhabitats by juvenile coho salmon in Jordan Creek during the winter, 2004-2005 / by Ryan J. Briscoe. Hosted by the Alaska State Publications Program.

External links

coho salmon
Salmon
Cold water fish
Fish of the Pacific Ocean
Fish of the United States
Freshwater fish of Japan
Western North American coastal fauna
Commercial fish
Sport fish
coho salmon
Taxa named by Johann Julius Walbaum